The Chalet Eugenia is a chalet in Klosters which has been used by members of the British Royal Family for over three decades.

History & background
Chalet Eugenia was built after World War II and was completed in 1958 by Baroness Thyssen-Bornemisza. It was subsequently bought by the Bentinck family and later sold in 2012 to the Swiss businessman Rolf Theiler.

Style & interior

The chalet's interior design dates from the 1950s, and has been largely retained. The drawing room has a central pillared stone log fireplace leading onto an oak beamed and paneled dining room. The second dining room is equipped with the original wood fired oven. Most rooms have their own balconies and terraces with views of the Gotschna mountainous region. In 2006 Tom Robbins described the chalet as "the poshest pad in the Alps". The chalet overlooks the village of Klosters, described by Harper's Bazaar as "the ski resort beloved of the royal family".

Skiing
Chalet Eugenia has a 'Ski in & Ski out' children's Heid Ski Lift directly next to the northwesterly side of the chalet, allowing access to the T-bar lift powered slope.

Klosters & society
The Klosters ski resort has long been a winter destination for the British Royal Family. Prince William and Prince Harry learnt to ski in the village. Other celebrities who have vacationed at the resort include Paul Newman, Audrey Hepburn, Diana, Princess of Wales, Winston Churchill, Howard Hawks, William Wyler, John F. Kennedy's sister Patricia Kennedy Lawford, Kenneth More, Major Hugh Lindsay, Vivien Leigh, Lauren Bacall, Stavros Niarchos, Carol Thatcher, Georgina Fitzalan-Howard, Duchess of Norfolk, Gregory Peck, Yul Brynner, Kay Kendall, Juliette Gréco, Roger Vadim, David Niven, Robert Capa, Prince Edward, Duke of Kent, Princess Margaret, Countess of Snowdon, Greta Garbo and Gene Kelly, who danced on the tables in the hotel bar of the Hotel Chesa Grischuna where Rex Harrison discussed his musical notes for "My Fair Lady" with the hotel pianist.

Producer of 'Gone with the wind', David O. Selznick and his wife Jennifer Jones along with Julie Andrews, Peter Sellers and Britt Ekland were all regulars in the sixties. Irwin Shaw had a street named after him. Billy Wilder came to ski and party in the village every winter, Julie Andrews wrote; "I could have danced all night!" Baroness Joanna von Schenk's chalet has the following quote carved into the wood; "If you were very good in a previous life, God will give you Klosters in the next." Peter Viertel described Klosters as "Hollywood on the Rocks" in his autobiography 'Dangerous Friends' and in 1960 he married Deborah Kerr in the village.

More recent visitors include Lord Mandelson, billionaires Nathaniel Philip Rothschild, and Peter Munk Benjamin Wegg-Prosser, Tara Palmer-Tomkinson, Sir Simon Robertson, Rupert Everett, John Fairchild, Nicholas Wheeler, Chrissie Rucker and Swiss movie producer Marc Forster. In 2009 and 2010 Prince Andrew rented Chalet Eugenia during the Davos World Economic Forum,  hosting Lord Mandelson and George Osborne during his first visit.

See also
Klosters
Rolf Theiler

References

External links
 Website Chalet Eugenia

Klosters-Serneus
Ski areas and resorts in Switzerland
Cultural property of national significance in Graubünden
Grisons
Swiss culture